Graham Hewitt Walker is an American academic, professor, and Senior Research Scholar at the Witherspoon Institute.  Walker received his Ph.D. in political philosophy from Notre Dame in 1988. He is a former administration in Christian higher education, serving as the Vice President for Academic Affairs and Dean of Oklahoma Wesleyan University as well as the second President of Patrick Henry College.  Walker has previously taught at the University of Pennsylvania, The Catholic University of America and Patrick Henry College.

References
PHC - Office of the President
Witherspoon Institute - Research Scholars

Patrick Henry College faculty
Presidents of Patrick Henry College
Living people
Governmental studies academics
University of Pennsylvania faculty
Catholic University of America faculty
University of Notre Dame alumni
Oklahoma Wesleyan University faculty
Houghton University alumni
American political scientists
Year of birth missing (living people)